Isoniazid, also known as isonicotinic acid hydrazide (INH), is an antibiotic used for the treatment of tuberculosis. For active tuberculosis it is often used together with rifampicin, pyrazinamide, and either streptomycin or ethambutol. For latent tuberculosis it is often used by itself. It may also be used for atypical types of mycobacteria, such as M. avium, M. kansasii, and M. xenopi. It is usually taken by mouth but may be used by injection into muscle.

Common side effects include increased blood levels of liver enzymes and numbness in the hands and feet. Serious side effects may include liver inflammation and acute liver failure. It is unclear if use during pregnancy is safe for the baby. Use during breastfeeding is likely safe. Pyridoxine may be given to reduce the risk of side effects. Isoniazid works in part by disrupting the formation of the bacteria's cell wall which results in cell death.

Isoniazid was first made in 1952. It is on the World Health Organization's List of Essential Medicines. The World Health Organization classifies isoniazid as critically important for human medicine. Isoniazid is available as a generic medication.

Medical uses

Tuberculosis
Isoniazid is often used to treat latent and active tuberculosis infections. In persons with isoniazid-sensitive Mycobacterium tuberculosis infection, drug regimens based on isoniazid are usually effective when persons adhere to the prescribed treatment. However, in persons with isoniazid-resistant Mycobacterium tuberculosis infection, drug regimens based on isoniazid have a high rate of failure.

Isoniazid has been approved as prophylactic therapy for the following populations:
 People with HIV infection and a PPD (purified protein derivative) reaction of at least 5 mm induration
 Contacts of people with tuberculosis and who have a PPD reaction at least 5 mm induration
 People whose PPD reactions convert from negative to positive in a two-year period – at least 10 mm induration for those up to 35 years of age, and at least 15 mm induration for those at least 35 years old
 People with pulmonary damage on their chest X-ray that is likely to be due to healed tuberculosis and also have a PPD reaction at least 5 mm induration
 Injection drug users whose HIV status is negative who have a PPD reaction at least 10 mm induration
 People with a PPD of greater than or equal to 10 mm induration who are foreign-born from high prevalence geographical regions, low-income populations, and patients residing in long-term facilities

Isoniazid can be used alone or in combination with Rifampin for treatment of latent tuberculosis, or as part of a four-drug regimen for treatment of active tuberculosis. The drug regimen typically requires daily or weekly oral administration for a period of three to nine months, often under Directly Observed Therapy (DOT) supervision.

Non-tuberculous mycobacteria
Isoniazid was widely used in the treatment of Mycobacterium avium complex as part of a regimen including rifampicin and ethambutol. Evidence suggests that isoniazid prevents mycolic acid synthesis in M. avium complex as in M. tuberculosis and although this is not bactericidal to M. avium complex, it greatly potentiates the effect of rifampicin. The introduction of macrolides led to this use greatly decreasing. However, since rifampicin is broadly underdosed in M. avium complex treatment, this effect may be worth re-investigating.

Special populations
It is recommended that women with active tuberculosis who are pregnant or breastfeeding take isoniazid. Preventive therapy should be delayed until after giving birth. Nursing mothers excrete a relatively low and non-toxic concentration of INH in breast milk, and their babies are at low risk for side effects. Both pregnant women and infants being breastfed by mothers taking INH should take vitamin B6 in its pyridoxine form to minimize the risk of peripheral nerve damage.
Vitamin B6 is used to prevent isoniazid-induced B6 deficiency and neuropathy in people with a risk factor, such as pregnancy, lactation, HIV infection, alcoholism, diabetes, kidney failure, or malnutrition.

People with liver dysfunction are at a higher risk for hepatitis caused by INH, and may need a lower dose.

Levels of liver enzymes in the bloodstream should be frequently checked in daily alcohol drinkers, pregnant women, IV drug users, people over 35, and those who have chronic liver disease, severe kidney dysfunction, peripheral neuropathy, or HIV infection since they are more likely to develop hepatitis from INH.

Side effects
Up to 20% of people taking isoniazid experience peripheral neuropathy when taking doses of 6 mg/kg of weight daily or higher. Gastrointestinal reactions include nausea and vomiting. Aplastic anemia, thrombocytopenia, and agranulocytosis due to lack of production of red blood cells, platelets, and white blood cells by the bone marrow respectively, can also occur. Hypersensitivity reactions are also common and can present with a maculopapular rash and fever. Gynecomastia may occur.

Asymptomatic elevation of serum liver enzyme concentrations occurs in 10% to 20% of people taking INH, and liver enzyme concentrations usually return to normal even when treatment is continued. Isoniazid has a boxed warning for severe and sometimes fatal hepatitis, which is age-dependent at a rate of 0.3% in people 21 to 35 years old and over 2% in those over age 50. Symptoms suggestive of liver toxicity include nausea, vomiting, abdominal pain, dark urine, right upper quadrant pain, and loss of appetite. Black and Hispanic women are at higher risk for isoniazid-induced hepatotoxicity. When it happens, isoniazid-induced liver toxicity has been shown to occur in 50% of patients within the first 2 months of therapy.

Some recommend that liver function should be monitored carefully in all people receiving it, but others recommend monitoring only in certain populations.

Headache, poor concentration, weight gain, poor memory, insomnia, and depression have all been associated with isoniazid use. All patients and healthcare workers should be aware of these serious side effects, especially if suicidal ideation or behavior are suspected.

Isoniazid is associated with pyridoxine (vitamin B6) deficiency because of its similar structure. Isoniazid is also associated with increased excretion of pyridoxine. Pyridoxal phosphate (a derivative of pyridoxine) is required for δ-aminolevulinic acid synthase, the enzyme responsible for the rate-limiting step in heme synthesis. Therefore, isoniazid-induced pyridoxine deficiency causes insufficient heme formation in early red blood cells, leading to sideroblastic anemia.

Isoniazid was found to significantly elevate the in vivo concentration of GABA and homocarnosine in a single subject via magnetic resonance spectroscopy.

Drug interactions
People taking isoniazid and acetaminophen are at risk of acetaminophen toxicity. Isoniazid is thought to induce a liver enzyme which causes a larger amount of acetaminophen to be metabolized to a toxic form.

Isoniazid decreases the metabolism of carbamazepine, thus slowing down its clearance from the body. People taking carbamazepine should have their carbamazepine levels monitored and, if necessary, have their dose adjusted accordingly.

It is possible that isoniazid may decrease the serum levels of ketoconazole after long-term treatment. This is seen with the simultaneous use of rifampin, isoniazid, and ketoconazole.

Isoniazid may increase the amount of phenytoin in the body. The doses of phenytoin may need to be adjusted when given with isoniazid.

Isoniazid may increase the plasma levels of theophylline. There are some cases of theophylline slowing down isoniazid elimination. Both theophylline and isoniazid levels should be monitored.

Valproate levels may increase when taken with isoniazid. Valproate levels should be monitored and its dose adjusted if necessary.

Mechanism of action
Isoniazid is a prodrug that inhibits the formation of the mycobacterial cell wall. Isoniazid must be activated by KatG, a bacterial catalase-peroxidase enzyme in Mycobacterium tuberculosis. KatG catalyzes the formation of the isonicotinic acyl radical, which spontaneously couples with NADH to form the nicotinoyl-NAD adduct. This complex binds tightly to the enoyl-acyl carrier protein reductase InhA, thereby blocking the natural enoyl-AcpM substrate and the action of fatty acid synthase. This process inhibits the synthesis of mycolic acids, which are required components of the mycobacterial cell wall. A range of radicals are produced by KatG activation of isoniazid, including nitric oxide, which has also been shown to be important in the action of another antimycobacterial prodrug pretomanid.

Isoniazid is bactericidal to rapidly dividing mycobacteria, but is bacteriostatic if the mycobacteria are slow-growing. It inhibits the cytochrome P450 system and hence acts as a source of free radicals.

Isoniazid is a mild monoamine oxidase inhibitor(MAO-I).

Metabolism
Isoniazid reaches therapeutic concentrations in serum, cerebrospinal fluid, and within caseous granulomas. It is metabolized in the liver via acetylation into acetylhydrazine. Two forms of the enzyme are responsible for acetylation, so some patients metabolize the drug more quickly than others. Hence, the half-life is bimodal, with "slow acetylators" and "fast acetylators". A graph of number of people versus time shows peaks at one and three hours. The height of the peaks depends on the ethnicities of the people being tested. The metabolites are excreted in the urine. Doses do not usually have to be adjusted in case of renal failure.

History
First synthesis was described in 1912. A. Kachugin invented the drug against tuberculosis under name Tubazid in 1949. Three pharmaceutical companies unsuccessfully attempted to patent the drug at the same time, the most prominent one being Roche, which launched its version, Rimifon, in 1952. With the introduction of isoniazid, a cure for tuberculosis was first considered possible.

The drug was first tested at Many Farms, a Navajo community in Arizona, due to the Navajo reservation's tuberculosis problem and because the population had not previously been treated with streptomycin, the main tuberculosis treatment at the time. The research was led by Walsh McDermott, an infectious disease researcher with an interest in public health, who had previously taken isoniazid to treat his own tuberculosis.

Isoniazid and a related drug, iproniazid, were among the first drugs to be referred to as antidepressants.

Preparation
Isoniazid is an isonicotinic acid derivative. It is manufactured using 4-cyanopyridine and hydrazine hydrate. In another method, isoniazid was claimed to have been made from citric acid starting material.

It can in theory be made from methyl isonicotinate, which is labelled a semiochemical.

Brand names
Hydra, Hyzyd, Isovit, Laniazid, Nydrazid, Rimifon, and Stanozide.

Other uses

Chromatography
Isonicotinic acid hydrazide is also used in chromatography to differentiate between various degrees of conjugation in organic compounds barring the ketone functional group. The test works by forming a hydrazone which can be detected by its bathochromic shift.

Dogs
Isoniazid may be used for dogs, but there have been concerns it can cause seizures.

References

Further reading

External links 
 
 

Anti-tuberculosis drugs
Antidepressants
CYP3A4 inhibitors
Disulfiram-like drugs
GABA transaminase inhibitors
Hepatotoxins
Hydrazides
4-Pyridyl compounds
Prodrugs
Vitamin B6 antagonists
World Health Organization essential medicines
Wikipedia medicine articles ready to translate